There are more than 60 current and former places of worship in the borough of Elmbridge in Surrey, England.  Various Christian denominations operate 48 churches, chapels and meeting houses across the borough, and there are two synagogues; a further 12 buildings no longer serve a religious function but survive in alternative uses.  Elmbridge is one 11 local government districts in the county of Surrey—a small inland county south of London.  The borough is mostly urban, with a series of small towns and villages connected by suburban development.  Ancient parish churches survive in several places, but most places of worship were established in the 19th and 20th centuries.

The United Kingdom Census 2011 reported that the majority of residents are Christian.  The Church of England, the country's Established Church, is represented by the largest number of church buildings; there are also several Roman Catholic churches; and chapels serving members of the major Protestant Nonconformist denominations such as Methodists, Baptists and the United Reformed Church can be found in towns and villages across the borough.  Other denominations and groups represented in the borough include Christian Scientists, The Church of Jesus Christ of Latter-day Saints, Jehovah's Witnesses, the New Apostolic Church, Quakers and Spiritualists.  A congregation of Korean Presbyterians meets in the town of Weybridge, and synagogues serve Jews of both the Liberal tradition and the Movement for Reform Judaism.

Historic England has granted listed status to 18 current places of worship in the borough, as well as to one former church.  A building is defined as "listed" when it is placed on a statutory register of buildings of "special architectural or historic interest" in accordance with the Planning (Listed Buildings and Conservation Areas) Act 1990. The Department for Digital, Culture, Media and Sport, a Government department, is responsible for this; Historic England, a non-departmental public body, acts as an agency of the department to administer the process and advise the department on relevant issues. There are three grades of listing status. Grade I, the highest, is defined as being of "exceptional interest"; Grade II* is used for "particularly important buildings of more than special interest"; and Grade II, the lowest, is used for buildings of "special interest". As of February 2001, there were 8 Grade I-listed buildings, 20 with Grade II* status and 462 Grade II-listed buildings in the borough.  There are also four locally listed churches which have been categorised by Elmbridge Borough Council as being of local architectural or historic interest.

Overview of the borough and its places of worship

Elmbridge is located in the north of the county of Surrey in southeast England, adjacent to Greater London.  Clockwise from the north, it has boundaries with the London Borough of Richmond upon Thames and the Royal Borough of Kingston upon Thames, also in London; and the boroughs and districts of Mole Valley, Guildford, Woking, Runnymede and Spelthorne in Surrey.  The largest towns are Walton-on-Thames and its neighbour Weybridge, which in 2001 had populations of 22,834 and 19,463 respectively.  West Molesey, Hersham and Cobham each had a population of roughly 12,000 in the same year, while Esher and Thames Ditton each had around 8,000 residents.  Smaller settlements, in decreasing order of population, are Claygate, East Molesey, Long Ditton, Hinchley Wood, Oxshott, Stoke d'Abernon and Weston Green.  The borough is affluent and has a high standard of living, regularly being named the best place to live in England.  Proximity to London, the airports at Gatwick and Heathrow and the M25 motorway, low crime and good-quality schools make it an expensive place to live: it has been described as "Britain's Beverly Hills".  The total population in 2011 was just over 130,000.

Cobham, Stoke d'Abernon, Thames Ditton and Walton-on-Thames each have ancient parish churches.  At Cobham, St Andrew's Church retains its Norman tower, and much of the other work dates from the 13th, 14th and 15th centuries.  Parts of the chancel and nave at St Mary's Church in nearby Stoke d'Abernon are even older, dating from the Saxon period, and Roman brickwork has been reused in the walls.  The massive, low tower, chancel and some windows at St Nicholas' Church in Thames Ditton date from the 13th century, and the font is a century older.  St Mary's Church at Walton-on-Thames retains some Norman-era fabric, but much of the structure dates from the 14th and 15th centuries.  Esher's church, which existed by the late 13th century, was replaced by the "delightful [and] endearing" St George's Church in about 1540.

Many of Elmbridge's Anglican churches date from the Victorian era.  The ancient church at Weybridge was replaced by a new building on a different site in the churchyard in 1848.  St James's Church was designed by John Loughborough Pearson and was extended in 1864.  Similarly, St Mary's Church at Long Ditton replaced a 12th-century church nearby in 1878.  St Mary's Church at East Molesey and St Peter's Church in West Molesey were completely rebuilt in 1864–67 and 1843 respectively; the only older feature surviving at either church is the tower of St Peter's, which is 16th-century.  Also in the Victorian era, several new Anglican churches were built to cope with the rapid population growth in the area.  Holy Trinity Church at Claygate, initially a chapel of ease to Thames Ditton but separately parished within a year, opened in 1840.  A year earlier, a church with same dedication was built at Hersham as a chapel of ease to Walton-on-Thames.  A parish was formed in 1851, and replacement church (dedicated to St Peter) opened in 1887.  Christ Church (1853–54) became the new parish church of Esher, superseding St George's Church.  St Paul's Church at East Molesey was built in 1854 and was separated from the parish of St Mary's Church two years later.  St Mary's Church at Oatlands opened in 1861 as a chapel of ease in Walton-on-Thames parish; it was allocated its own parish eight years later.  Anglican services were held in a school in the village of Oxshott in Stoke d'Abernon parish during the 19th century.  In 1912, a permanent church dedicated to St Andrew was built.  Other 20th-century churches opened at Weston Green in 1939, succeeding a mission chapel of 1901, and Hinchley Wood and the southern part of Walton-on-Thames after World War II.  A tin tabernacle which was in use by 1911 still serves as a mission chapel in Esher parish; and another mission chapel exists in the hamlet of Downside within the parish of Ockham.  There is also a church at Whiteley Village, a model village designed for retired people and laid out between 1914 and 1921.

The historic centre for Roman Catholic worship in the area was Woburn Park, a house and country estate between Addlestone and Weybridge.  This was owned by Philip Southcote and included a Catholic chapel served by priests from the Dominican Order, but it closed when the estate was sold to a non-Catholic in 1815.  In that year a priest established a new Catholic mission in his own house in Weybridge.  In 1836 a Catholic landowner and architect, James Taylor, built a new chapel on his land; this tiny building later became the sacristy of a new, much larger church dedicated to St Charles Borromeo and opened in 1881.  The church at Surbiton then founded two missions in present-day Elmbridge in 1905.  A church was built that year and opened in 1906 in Walton-on-Thames; the present St Erconwald's Church succeeded it in 1937.  At West Molesey, a house was converted into a mission chapel and opened in September 1905; it was succeeded by a tin tabernacle and then by the present St Barnabas' Church, built in 1931.  More churches were built after World War II: in Cobham (1958), Hersham (1960), Claygate (1960–61) and Thames Ditton (1965).  An increase in the Catholic population of Weybridge also led to a disused cinema being converted into a second church.  Both this, dedicated to St Martin de Porres, and St Charles Borromeo remained open until 1988; money from the sale of both buildings was put towards a new church and parish centre on a different site.  The Church of Christ Prince of Peace opened in 1989.  St Charles Borromeo Church became a Korean Presbyterian church, while St Martin de Porres Church was demolished and replaced with offices.

The Methodist Statistical Returns published in 1947 recorded the existence of chapels with Wesleyan Methodist origins at Cobham, East Molesey, Esher, Walton-on-Thames and Weybridge.  At East Molesey, Wesleyan services began in 1847 in a schoolroom.  John Chubb of the Chubb and Sons locksmith company, an active and wealthy Wesleyan who founded various chapels and who sometimes fished in the River Thames at Molesey, bought some land for a chapel in 1866 and became a trustee of the church.  A temporary building opened in 1867, succeeded by the present yellow-brick chapel in 1877.  A Wesleyan chapel was built on Annett Road in Walton-on-Thames in the mid-19th century and was succeeded by the present chapel on Terrace Road in 1887.  The brick chapel in Weybridge was registered in 1903.  The Methodist church at Esher was registered in 1897 but closed by 2000, when its registration was cancelled.  At Cobham—where John Wesley stopped on three occasions while travelling along the Portsmouth Road—a chapel opened on Cedar Road in 1862.  A Sunday School was built next to it in the 1930s, and this was converted into a church in 1964 when the old chapel was demolished.  In 2018 the church amalgamated with Cobham United Reformed Church in a Local ecumenical partnership and the Cedar Road building went out of use.

The United Reformed Church was formed in 1972 when the Congregational Church and the Presbyterian Church of England merged.  Churches with a Congregational origin exist in Stoke d'Abernon, Thames Ditton and Weybridge, while Walton-on-Thames has a former Presbyterian church.  The Thames Ditton church can trace its origins back to 1804, but the present building dates from 1899.  The cause declined in the 1930s, and a near-decade long period of closure came to an end in 1947.  A Congregational mission was founded at Cobham in 1847 and a permanent chapel was built seven years later, although the present building at Stoke d'Abernon (Cobham United Church, shared with Methodists) dates from 1963.  House meetings briefly took place in Weybridge in 1855, and "much interest was excited" by open-air preaching five years later.  This led to services being held in the billiard-room of a house, succeeded in 1864 by the present 350-capacity Gothic Revival church (described as "ferocious" by Nikolaus Pevsner).  For many years there was also a Congregational church at Hersham serving both the village and nearby Walton-on-Thames: the circular yellow-brick building opened in 1844 and was altered and extended in 1858, 1864 and 1889.  Around 1907 some members seceded and founded a second church nearby; this continued in use after the 1844 church closed, and was replaced by a new building in 1983.  This was deregistered in 2008 and is now in alternative use.  St Andrew's Presbyterian Church in Walton-on-Thames was built in 1931 as a church hall, intended to be superseded by a permanent church; the hall remains in religious use by the United Reformed Church, and ancillary buildings have since been erected.  Presbyterians had previously met for worship in a theatre since 1928.

A Baptist fellowship was founded in Esher in 1852 and a chapel was built and registered there in 1869.  Four years later, members founded a "branch chapel" at Oxshott.  A tin tabernacle was erected for Baptists in East Molesey in 1885 and replaced with a permanent building the following year, and in 1906 a chapel was registered in Walton-on-Thames.  Only the last named has been in continuous use since it opened.  Esher Baptist Church (originally called Park Road Chapel) closed in 1977 after a period of decline, but reopened in 1983 under its present name, Esher Green Baptist Church, as a church plant from Walton-on-Thames.  The chapel at East Molesey closed in 1896, although a new church replaced it the following year.  This closed in the 1930s and was demolished soon afterwards.  The registration of Oxshott Baptist Chapel was cancelled in 1980.  Also no longer in religious use are the borough's two Strict Baptist chapels: these were built at Claygate in 1860 and at Cobham in 1873.  In 1994, a new Baptist church was established in a redundant Anglican church building in Hersham.

Other Christian denominations with a presence in the borough include Spiritualists, who worship in a church in Walton-on-Thames; Christian Scientists, who have churches and reading rooms at Claygate (serving the village and Esher) and Oatlands (serving Walton-on-Thames and Weybridge); Jehovah's Witnesses, whose Kingdom Hall at West Molesey was registered in 1971; The Church of Jesus Christ of Latter-day Saints, whose meetinghouse for the Kingston Ward opened in 1978 in Hinchley Wood; and the New Apostolic Church, which registered a building in Long Ditton in the same year.  A much older cause is the Quaker meeting house in Esher, which was established in the 1790s and which has experienced minimal alteration since it was built.  (An earlier Quaker meeting house established in 1678 at Cobham fell out of use in 1739.)  Various nondenominational churches also exist in the borough, including Emmanuel Church at Hersham and Cornerstone The Church in Walton-on-Thames.

The Jewish population of the borough is represented by the Kingston Liberal Synagogue at Thames Ditton, which is in the Liberal tradition, and the Reform-tradition North West Surrey Synagogue at Oatlands.

Religious affiliation
According to the United Kingdom Census 2011, 130,875 people live in Elmbridge.  Of these, 64.16% identified themselves as Christian, 1.84% were Muslim, 1.22% were Hindu, 0.61% were Jewish, 0.52% were Buddhist, 0.4% were Sikh, 0.34% followed another religion, 23.39% claimed no religious affiliation and 7.53% did not state their religion.  The proportions of Christians, Jews and Buddhists were higher than the figures in England as a whole (59.38%, 0.49% and 0.45% respectively), and the proportion of people who did not answer this census question was also higher than the overall figure of 7.18%.  Islam, Hinduism and Sikhism had a lower following in the borough than in the country overall: in 2011, 5.02% of people in England were Muslim, 1.52% were Hindu and 0.79% were Sikh.  The proportions of people in Elmbridge claiming adherence to another religion or no religious affiliation were also lower than the national figures of 0.43% and 24.74%.

Administration

Anglican churches

The Diocese of Guildford administers all of the borough's Anglican churches.  Its seat is Guildford Cathedral.  The churches are grouped geographically into deaneries.  These lie within one of two Archdeaconries—Dorking Archdeaconry and Surrey Archdeaconry—which are an intermediate administrative level between the diocese and the deaneries.  All of Elmbridge's churches are part of Emly Deanery or Leatherhead Deanery, both of which are in the Dorking Archdeaconry.  Emly Deanery covers the churches in Claygate, East Molesey (St Mary's Church and St Paul's Church, which are separate parishes), Esher, Hersham, Hinchley Wood, Long Ditton, Oatlands, Thames Ditton, Walton-on-Thames, West Molesey, Weston Green and Weybridge.  Cobham, Downside, Oxshott and Stoke d'Abernon are part of Leatherhead Deanery.

Roman Catholic churches
All Roman Catholic churches in Elmbridge are administered by Weybridge Deanery, one of 13 deaneries in the Roman Catholic Diocese of Arundel and Brighton, whose cathedral is at Arundel in West Sussex. The churches are at Claygate, Cobham, East Molesey, Hersham, Thames Ditton, Walton-on-Thames and Weybridge.

Other denominations
The 11-church Wey Valley Methodist Circuit administers the Methodist churches in Walton-on-Thames and Weybridge.  East Molesey Methodist Church is one of five churches in the Teddington Methodist Circuit.  Cobham United Church is one of eight churches in the Dorking and Horsham Methodist Circuit, and is also part of the Southern Synod of the United Reformed Church along with the church at Thames Ditton.  Weybridge United Reformed Church and St Andrew's United Reformed Church at Walton-on-Thames are part of the Wessex Synod.  Esher Green Baptist Church, Hersham Baptist Church and Walton Baptist Church are part of the Thames Valley District of London Baptists, the regional association responsible for Baptist churches in London and the surrounding area.

Listed status

Current places of worship

Former places of worship

Notes

References

Bibliography

 (Available online in 14 parts; Guide to abbreviations on page 6)

Elmbridge (borough)
Elmbridge
Elmbridge (borough)
Churches
Elmbridge places of worship